Restoration Society may refer to:

Guangfuhui, an anti-Qing organisation in China
Ishinkai, a defunct political party in Japan